"Give a Little More" is a song by American band Maroon 5. It was released on August 17, 2010, as the second single from their third studio album Hands All Over (2010).

Background and composition
"Give a Little More" was written by the band's frontman Adam Levine with keyboardist Jesse Carmichael and guitarist James Valentine. The lyrics talk about how to ask more of a woman who so clearly has you wrapped around her finger, "You were wrong for turning me on and on and on," Levine sings. "I'm waiting for something, always waiting / Feeling nothing, wondering if it'll ever change." Ultimately, he resigns himself to the fact that, "I have no defense / I know you're gonna get me in the end."

Critical reception 
The song received positive reviews from contemporary music critics. Ron Harris from the Associated Press wrote that the song "almost strays into disco territory with  body-moving beat." He commented that the song "would not have been terribly out of place in 1979", while complimenting that the song is "fun and funky, which is the prime directive of Maroon 5." Robbie Daw from Idolator wrote a positive review, stating that "M5 are always best when they’re uptempo, so we’re happy to hear that the song falls in line with the band’s more danceable tracks like "Wake Up Call" and "Misery." Leah Greenblatt from Entertainment Weekly wrote that "Levine's romantic roundelay trundles on, through this airy disco-boogie." Mikael Wood from LA Times wrote that "a light-funk groove as neatly executed as the one in “Give a Little More,” for instance, is its own reward". Chris Ryan from MTV News was direct, writing that "the track is classic Maroon; a slithering groove and chicken-scratch guitar laying the foundation for singer Adam Levine's nasal coo and come-hither lyrics."

Music video 
The music video for "Give a Little More" was directed by Paul Hunter. The video was released on September 9, 2010. It is shot using a grainy film style complete with intro countdown and outro of the film running off the reel, and consists of quick cuts between close-ups of Levine singing, along with scenes of the band playing at a party inside an older house, with everyone dancing to the music.

Live video 
A video of the band playing the song for Vevo's Summer Sets was also released around the same time.

Track listing 
Digital download
 "Give a Little More" – 3:00

Roger Sanchez Remixes EP 
 "Give a Little More" (Club Mix) – 4:14
 "Give a Little More" (Radio Edit) – 3:30
 "Give a Little More" (Dub Mix) – 6:21
 "Give a Little More" (Club Mix - Acapella) – 2:50
 "Give a Little More" (Club Mix - Instrumental) – 4:13

Charts

Release history

References 

2010 singles
2010 songs
Maroon 5 songs
Song recordings produced by Robert John "Mutt" Lange
Songs written by Adam Levine
Songs written by Jesse Carmichael
Songs written by James Valentine (musician)
Music videos directed by Paul Hunter (director)
Torch songs
A&M Octone Records singles